RIS is a standardized tag format developed by Research Information Systems, Incorporated (the format name refers to the company) to enable citation programs to exchange data. It is supported by a number of reference managers.  Many digital libraries, like IEEE Xplore, Scopus, the ACM Portal, Scopemed, ScienceDirect, SpringerLink, Rayyan, Accordance Bible Software, and online library catalogs can export citations in this format. Citation management applications such as BibDesk, RefWorks, Zotero, Citavi, Papers, Mendeley, and EndNote can export and import citations in this format.

Format 
The RIS file format—two letters, two spaces and a hyphen—is a tagged format for expressing bibliographic citations. According to the specifications, the lines must end with the ASCII carriage return and line feed characters. Note that this is the convention on Microsoft Windows, while in other contemporary operating systems, particularly Unix, the end of line is typically marked by line feed only.

Multiple citation records can be present in a single RIS file. A record ends with an "end record" tag  with no additional blank lines between records.

Example record 

This is an example of how the article "Claude E. Shannon. A mathematical theory of communication. Bell System Technical Journal, 27:379–423, July 1948" would be expressed in the RIS file format:

TY  - JOUR
AU  - Shannon, Claude E.
PY  - 1948
DA  - July
TI  - A Mathematical Theory of Communication
T2  - Bell System Technical Journal
SP  - 379
EP  - 423
VL  - 27
ER  -

Example multi-record format 

This is an example of how two citation records would be expressed in a single RIS file.

TY  - JOUR
AU  - Shannon, Claude E.
PY  - 1948
DA  - July
TI  - A Mathematical Theory of Communication
T2  - Bell System Technical Journal
SP  - 379
EP  - 423
VL  - 27
ER  - 
TY  - JOUR
T1  - On computable numbers, with an application to the Entscheidungsproblem
A1  - Turing, Alan Mathison
JO  - Proc. of London Mathematical Society
VL  - 47
IS  - 1
SP  - 230
EP  - 265
Y1  - 1937
ER  -

Tags 

There are two major versions of the RIS specification. The second version, introduced near the end of 2011 has different lists of tags for each type of record, sometimes with different meanings. Below is an excerpt of the main RIS tags, from both versions.

Type of reference 

The type of reference preceded by the  tag may abbreviated:

See also 

 BIBFRAME—bibliographic framework, an emerging standard to replace MARC
 Bibliographic record—general concept
 BibTeX—a text-based data format used by LaTeX
 EndNote—a text-based data scheme used by the EndNote program
 MARC—machine-readable cataloging standards
 refer—an aging text-based data scheme supported on UNIX-like systems

References

 
 
Bibliography file formats